The Regius Professorship of Hebrew in the University of Cambridge is an ancient academic chair at the University of Cambridge founded by King Henry VIII in 1540.

When created, the professorship carried a permanent stipend of £40 per year. In 1848 this was increased a canonry of Ely Cathedral being attached to the post in perpetuity.

List of Regius Professors
The chair has been held by:

References

 
Hebrew, Regius
School of Arts and Humanities, University of Cambridge
Hebrew, Cambridge
Hebrew, Regius, Cambridge
Hebrew-speaking people by occupation